Acraea dammii is a butterfly in the family Nymphalidae. It is found on Madagascar and the Comoros.

Description

A. dammii Vollenh. (53 b). Forewing to the apex of the cell and hindwing not or scarcely beyond the black spots scaled with red (male) or white (female); the hyaline marginal band of the hindwing is consequently broad, reaching the black spot in 3; the large black spot in 7 is placed much nearer to the base than the one in 6. Madagascar. - cuva Smith (57 a) [ now species Acraea cuva] differs in having the red (male) or dirty yellow (female) scaling on both wings extended much further distad; hence the hyaline marginal band of the hindwing is only about 2 mm. in breadth; hindwing usually with 6 to 8 discal dots, occasionally only with 5, ab. nidama Suff. [ = Acraea cuva ] German and British East Africa.

Biology
The habitat consists of forests.

Taxonomy
It is a member of the Acraea terpsicore species group-   but see also Pierre & Bernaud, 2014

References

External links

 Images representing Acraea dammii at Bold

Butterflies described in 1869
dammii
Butterflies of Africa
Taxa named by Samuel Constantinus Snellen van Vollenhoven